Olivier Bonnaire (born 2 March 1983 in Le Quesnoy) is a French former road bicycle racer, who rode professionally from 2005 to 2011 with the  and  teams. He returned to cycling as an amateur in 2013 when he rode for the Entente Cycliste Vieux Condé-Péruwelz-Bury team. He is a cousin of racing cyclists David Lefèvre, Laurent Lefèvre and Marion Rousse.

Major results 

 2007 Giro d'Italia – 45th
 2006 Giro d'Italia – 115th
 2005 Giro d'Italia – 82nd
 Volta del Llangosti (2003)

References

External links 
Profile at Bouygues Télécom official website

1983 births
Living people
French male cyclists
People from Le Quesnoy
Sportspeople from Nord (French department)
Cyclists from Hauts-de-France